Anarchist Mountain is a mountain in British Columbia, Canada, which rises  above sea level. The term is used primarily to refer to the rural district around the summit and its communities, and also to the Crowsnest Highway with its long climb up the mountainside from the floor of the Okanagan Valley at Osoyoos, just below.

The name was officially adopted 6 June 1922 to refer to the plateau between Osoyoos, the town of Rock Creek, and the town of Sidley. Anarchist Mountain and Sidley were both named by Richard G. Sidley, a settler from Ontario who arrived in 1885, was appointed the first postmaster of Sidley in 1895, and was later made Justice of the Peace and Customs Officer.
Before Sidley, English speaking settlers called this summit Larch Tree Hill.

On July 16, 2003, a wildfire was sparked scorching 1,230 hectares along the mountain. Two structures were lost in the fire. It was believed to have originated from a car driving on the highway.

References 

 Destination Osoyoos
 Vanishing BC

External links 
 Anarchist Mountain Fire Department

One-thousanders of British Columbia
History of anarchism
Mining communities in British Columbia
Populated places in the South Okanagan
Populated places in the Boundary Country
Monashee Mountains
Populated places in the Okanagan Country
Canadian justices of the peace
Similkameen Division Yale Land District